Live at Mandel Hall is a live album by the Art Ensemble of Chicago recorded at the University of Chicago's Mandel Hall on their return to Chicago from Europe in January 1972 and released on the Delmark label. It features performances by Lester Bowie, Joseph Jarman, Roscoe Mitchell, Malachi Favors and Don Moye.

Reception
The Allmusic review by Scott Yanow states "Although there are some meandering moments during their lengthy set, the music almost always holds on to one's interest (a humorous drunken march is a high point) and gives listeners a very good idea of how the Art Ensemble sounded in its early days when it was not at all shy about exploring music's outer limits".

Track listing
 "Duffvipels/Checkmate/Dautalty/Mata Kimasu" (Art Ensemble of Chicago) - 76:25

Personnel
Lester Bowie: trumpet, percussion instruments
Malachi Favors Maghostut: bass, percussion instruments, vocals
Joseph Jarman: saxophones, clarinets, percussion instruments
Roscoe Mitchell: saxophones, clarinets, flute, percussion instruments
Don Moye: drums, percussion

References

Art Ensemble of Chicago live albums
1972 live albums
Delmark Records live albums